The regulation of telephone numbers in Germany is the responsibility of the Federal Network Agency of the German government. The agency has a mandate to telecommunications in Germany and other infrastructure systems.

Overview 
Germany has an open telephone numbering plan. Before 2010, area codes and subscriber telephone numbers had no fixed size, meaning that some subscriber numbers may be as short as two digits. As a result, dialing sequences are generally of a variable length, except for some non-geographic area codes for which subscriber numbers use a fixed-length format. It is not possible to determine unambiguously the end of a phone number from a prefix or the digits already dialed. This feature allows the extension of the length of phone numbers without revoking or changing existing numbers. Cell phone numbers in Germany are not given geographic area codes but non-geographic codes. Thus they can easily be told apart from other numbers.

A new numbering plan was introduced on 3 May 2010. Since then new landline telephone numbers have a standard length of 11 digits, which includes the area code but omits the trunk prefix (0). Area codes remain as they are and are still variable in length. Exceptions to the 11 digit rule are the four cities of Berlin, Frankfurt, Hamburg and Munich, which are the only cities with two digit area codes and require only 10 digit numbers so as not to exceed the maximum length of 8 digits for a subscriber number.

The German telephone network uses 5200 geographical area codes, the length of which varies from two to five digits (not including the trunk code 0), with five-digit area codes only being assigned in the New States (prefix 3). In general, geographic area codes start with digits 2 to 9, whereas other non-geographic area codes including those for cell phone usage are assigned to 1 and network services to 11.

Geographic numbering 

Geographic area codes have a length of two to five digits. The maximum total length is eleven digits.

Geographic numbers are assigned to carriers in blocks, from which these carriers can make derivative assignments to subscribers.

Subscriber numbers do not start with 0 or 11 and can be called directly from landlines within the same geographic area code.

Originally, the first digits following the area code would indicate a smaller area within these area codes or the type of the subscriber line (analogue or ISDN). However, this is no longer true as subscribers can keep their numbers when moving within an area code or when switching from analogue to ISDN. Further, new carriers assign numbers from different blocks.

 (xx) xxxx-xxxx
This is the format used for the four largest geographic areas in Germany: Berlin (30), Hamburg (40), Frankfurt (69) and Munich (89).
Newly assigned numbers have a length of eight digits for the local subscriber number, yielding a total length of ten digits (not including the 0 trunk code). This is shorter than the maximum of eleven digits in other areas in order to avoid local numbers to be longer than eight digits.
Numbers assigned in the past, which are generally grandfathered, may be as short as five digits.

 (xxx) xxxx-xxxx
In area codes that use three digits, newly assigned numbers (for all locations from May 2010; some cities were earlier, e.g. Cologne in February 2007) also have a length of eight digits, yielding a total length of eleven digits. Grandfathered numbers may be as short as four digits (seven total).

 (xxxx) xxx-xxxx
In area codes that use four digits, newly assigned numbers (for all locations from May 2010; some cities were earlier, e.g. Heidelberg in May 2003) have a length of seven digits, also yielding a total length of eleven digits. Grandfathered numbers may be as short as three digits (seven total) in very rural areas.

 (3xxxx) xx-xxxx
Some smaller areas in the former East Germany use five-digit area codes, all of which start with 3. Newly assigned numbers (for all locations from May 2010, some locations were earlier) have a length of six digits, also yielding a total length of eleven digits.

Non-geographic numbering 

Non-geographic numbers were originally assigned the prefix 1. However, some of these services have been moved to other area codes.

 10xy, 100yy
These numbers can be dialled in front of the actual phone number in order to select a carrier (virtual phone number).

 11…
Area codes starting with 11 overlap the prefix for network services. In general, these numbers cannot be dialled from abroad, with the exception being 116xxx (or +49-116xxx) for harmonised services of social value.

 12xx-xxxxxxx…
The prefix 012 has been assigned as a testbed for innovative services, such as VoIP or unified messaging, for which no other area codes were available. Allocations were only valid for a maximum of five years, after which new numbers would have to be assigned. Recent requests for registrations have been declined and referred to the premium-rate services under 900. When the last remaining allocation expires , the prefix is planned to be returned to the reserved range.

 137-xxx xxxxxxx, (138-1xxx…)
The area code 137 is assigned for services that may result in a high number of connections in a fairly short period of time, e.g. votes or competitions initiated from TV or radio shows. The first digit indicates the rate for a call, the second digit indicates the maximum number of calls that can be handled per time period.
There are also sixteen grandfathered numbers in the range 138-1, which have originally been allocated by Deutsche Bundespost.

 15xx-xxxxxxx, 16x-xxxxxxx, 17x-xxxxxxx
Mobile numbers are assigned non-geographic area codes starting with 15, 16 and 17 and have a length of 3 or 4 digits without the trunk prefix. The numbers have a total length of ten or eleven digits without the trunk prefix: numbers starting with 17 or 16 are 10 digits long except 176 and 1609, which are 11 digits long like the numbers starting with 15. 
Network operators issue area codes as listed in the following table.

{| class="wikitable"
! scope="col" | Prefix(ex)
! scope="col" | In use by
! scope="col" | MNP
|-
! scope="row" style="text-align:left" | 151, 160, 170, 171, 175
| T-Mobile (GSM/UMTS)
| yes
|-
! scope="row" style="text-align:left" | 152, 162, 172, 173, 174
| Vodafone (GSM/UMTS) || yes
|-
! scope="row" style="text-align:left" | 155, 157, 159, 163, 176, 177, 178, 179
| o2 Germany (GSM/UMTS)
| yes
|-
! scope="row" style="text-align:left" | 164, 168, 169
| e*message (pagers) || no
|-
|}

However, since the advent of mobile number portability, mobile phone number prefixes can no longer be relied on to determine the current operator behind a particular mobile phone number – only the original operator. As mobile phone plans often include different rates for intra-network calls, it is important for users on such plans to know the network operator of the party they wish to call. The information on which number is registered to which cellular network is updated daily and is publicly available.
All network operators offer free automated services that can be reached via phone and/or internet and give users the ability to enter any number and determine to which network the number belongs.

 18xx-xxxxxxx…18xxxxxxx-xx
The prefix 018 is used for user groups. The length of the block number and the terminal number is flexible from two to seven digits. However, the sum is always nine digits, yielding a total length of eleven digits including the 18.

 180-xxxxxxx
The area code 180 is used for service-oriented services, such as call centres, hotlines, etc. Prior to 1 March 2010, these numbers were known as shared cost services, a name that had been obsoleted by falling prices for national calls.

{| class="wikitable"
! scope="col" | Prefix
! scope="col" | Rate
! rate from landlines
! rate from mobile phones
|-
! scope="row" | 180-1
| time-based rate 1
| 0.039 €/min.
| max. 0.42 €/min.
|-
! scope="row" | 180-2
| per-call rate 1
| 0.06 €/call
| max. 0.42 €/min.
|-
! scope="row" | 180-3
| time-based rate 2
| 0.09 €/min.
| max. 0.42 €/min.
|-
! scope="row" | 180-4
| per-call rate 2
| 0.20 €/call
| max. 0.42 €/min.
|-
! scope="row" | 180-5
| time-based rate 3
| 0.14 €/min.
| max. 0.42 €/min.
|-
! scope="row" | 180-6
| per-call rate 3
| 0.20 €/call.
| max. 0.60 €/call.
|-
! scope="row" | 180-7
| time-based rate 4, first 30 seconds free
| 0.14 €/min. after 30s
| max. 0.42 €/min. after 30s
|}

 181-xxx-x…, 181-xxxx-x…
The area code 181 is used for international virtual private networks (international user groups). The length of the IVPN block number is three or four digits; the terminal number may be up to seven digits.

 19xxx
Numbers from 191 to 194 are used for dial-up access to online services (e.g. to the Internet).

 198…, 199…
Numbers starting with 198 and 199 are reserved for routing of service numbers and network-internal use.

 31-x
The numbers 31-0 and 31-1 are test numbers that reach a recorded announcement indicating the selected carrier for long-distance and local calls, respectively.

 32-xxxxxxxxx
National subscriber numbers have been allocated the area code 32. They are similar to geographic numbers but not tied to a specific location, allowing for nomadic use. Unlike personal numbers, national subscriber numbers are assigned to carriers in blocks, from which these carriers can make derivative assignments to subscribers. The total length is eleven digits (not counting the 0).

 700-xxxxxxxx
The area code 700 is used for personal numbering. Unlike national subscriber numbers, the numbers are assigned individually, allowing for memorable numbers.

 800-xxxxxxx
The area code 800 is assigned to freephone numbers. The numbers are assigned individually, allowing for memorable numbers.

 900-x-xxxxxx
The area code 900 is assigned to premium-rate services. The first digit following the area code indicates the service type:

{| class="wikitable"
! scope="col" | Prefix
! scope="col" | Service Type
|-
! scope="row" | 900-1
| Information services (no adult content)
|-
! scope="row" | 900-3
| Entertainment services (no adult content)
|-
! scope="row" | 900-5
| Other services (including those offering adult content)
|}
The numbers are assigned individually, allowing for memorable numbers.

 9009-xxxxxxx
So-called "dialers", that is programmes that call a premium-rate service or modify a computer's configuration to call such a service must use numbers using the area code 9009. These programmes must also be registered with the Federal Network Agency.

Emergency and network services 
Network services are not dialed with the trunk prefix 0. They resemble local numbers that start with 11 but usually cannot be dialed after an area code.

 110 – Police
 112 – Fire brigade, ambulance, rescue services (also the universal emergency number in the EU)
 115 – Civil services; requests are either answered directly or forwarded to the competent authority.
 116 xxx – Harmonised services of social value
 118 xx – Directory assistance
 19 222 – Non-emergency medical transports. This number is not an emergency number but a local number assigned uniformly in all geographic area codes. This requires dialling the area code from mobile phones or other non-geographic lines.
(Originally, the block 19 xxx was used for local numbers assigned uniformly in all or several geographic area codes. All other allocations have already been converted to ordinary geographic numbers.)

History 
Before German reunification, East Germany used country code +37. West Berlin was integrated into the West German telephone network, using the same international dialling code (+49) of West Germany, with the area code 311, later changed to 030. Unlike West Germany, from where calls to East Berlin were made using the prefix 00372 (international access code 00, East German country code 37, area code 2), calls from West Berlin required only the short code 0372. Conversely, those made to West Berlin from East Berlin only required the short code 849.

In 1992, two years after reunification, the telephone networks were merged under country code +49.

Geographic numbers in the New States were assigned area codes starting with 3, in some cases followed by the former East German area code (without the initial 0) or a code similar to it. Thus, Leipzig, for example, which had used East German domestic area code 41, was assigned the new area code 341 in the unified telephone system. On the other hand, some area codes were changed: for example, the small town of Zossen used to have East German area code 323, but the new area code is 3377. Area code 30, formerly used by West Berlin, was assigned to the entire reunified Berlin.

The released country code +37 was later reused as the initial digits of several new codes for European countries that became independent states at the time (e.g.: +370 for Lithuania, +374 for Armenia, +375 for Belarus, etc.), as well as some microstates whose telephone networks had formerly been integrated to those of surrounding larger countries (e.g. +376 for Andorra, +377 for Monaco and +378 for San Marino).

The German telephone network became fully digital in 1997, allowing more flexible use of the numbering space.

On 1 January 1998, the Federal Network Agency (named the Regulatory Authority for Telecommunications and Postal Services at the time) became the numbering authority for telephone numbers in Germany.

See also
List of dialling codes in Germany
Telephone numbers in the German Democratic Republic

References

ITU allocations list

External links
115 official site
Federal Network Agency - Number Management (German)

 
Germany
Telecommunications in Germany
Germany communications-related lists